Burfjord Church is a parish church of the Church of Norway in Kvænangen Municipality in Troms og Finnmark county, Norway. It is located in the village of Burfjord. It is one of the churches for the Kvænangen parish which is part of the Nord-Troms prosti (deanery) in the Diocese of Nord-Hålogaland. The white, wooden church was built in a rectangular style and it was first used as a bedehus chapel for a Laestadian congregation. On 5 July 2009, it was consecrated as a new church within the Church of Norway. The church seats about 80 people.

See also
List of churches in Nord-Hålogaland

References

Kvænangen
Churches in Troms
Wooden churches in Norway
21st-century Church of Norway church buildings
2009 establishments in Norway
Rectangular churches in Norway